Tartu railway station is the main railway station in Tartu, Estonia.

Tartu railway station is situated west of the centre Tartu. It was established in 1876 when Tapa–Tartu route was built. The station building was opened in 1877.

Passenger trains are operated by Elron and most services are towards Tallinn.  There are also services to  Valga and to Jõgeva, Orava, Koidula and Piusa.

There are two platforms with the length of 260m and 330m.

Gallery

See also
List of railway stations in Estonia
Rail transport in Estonia

References

External links

 Official website of Eesti Raudtee (EVR) – the national railway infrastructure company of Estonia  responsible for maintenance and traffic control of most of the Estonian railway network
 Official website of Elron – the national passenger train operating company of Estonia operating all domestic passenger train services

Railway stations in Estonia
Railway stations opened in 1876
1870s establishments in Estonia
Buildings and structures in Tartu
Transport in Tartu
Tourist attractions in Tartu